Ahmad Tajuddin Akhazul Khairi Waddien (August 22, 1913 – June 4, 1950) was the 27th Sultan of Brunei from 11 September 1924 until his death. After his death in 1950, he was then succeeded by his younger brother Omar Ali Saifuddien.  

His reign represented the start of a new era in Brunei. The discovery of oil changed the whole course of Brunei's history and enabled faster development in all sectors of the country. The expansion and improvement of formal education and his encouragement of religious education were some of his additional contributions to Brunei Darussalam. Due to the outbreak of the Second World War, it destroyed all the development and infrastructure he has worked on and fought for a quarter of a century.

Early life and education
Ahmad Tajuddin was born on 22 August 1913 at Istana Pekan in Brunei Town. He was the surviving eldest son to Sultan Muhammad Jamalul Alam II and his wife, Raja Isteri Pengiran Anak Siti Fatimah, after his older brother, Pengiran Muda Bongsu had died in 1910. His younger brother, Pengiran Muda Tengah Omar Ali Saifuddien succeeded him after his death. Before becoming the sultan, he was known as Pengiran Muda Besar Ahmad Tajuddin.

He received his early education in the palace prior attending formal school. One of the teachers who had been assigned to teach him was Cikgu Salleh Haji Masri. Salleh Haji Masri was one of the famous freedom fighters with anti-colonial sentiments. Ahmad Tajuddin sailed for England, United Kingdom in 1932. Before that, he had learned English from Mr. H.F. Stalley. He was in England for a year to learn the English language and a description of the western civilisation. He was the first Sultan in history to explore the western world more than his father, who had only sailed to Singapore and Labuan.

Reign

Early reign 
Sultan Ahmad Tajuddin ascended the throne on 11 September 1924, after the death of his father, Sultan Muhammad Jamalul Alam II. Due to his young age of 11, the reign was temporarily held by a Council of Regency which consisted of Pengiran Bendahara Pengiran Anak Abdul Rahman and Pengiran Pemancha Pengiran Anak Haji Mohammad Yassin from 11 September 1924 to 19 September 1931. After Brunei first exported oil in 1931, British residents began to settle into Brunei.

The relationship between the Sultan and the British soured when John Graham Black was appointed as the British Resident in 1937. The resident attempted to postpone and sabotage Ahmad Tajuddin's coronation ceremony and this infuriated the Sultan. This caused the resident to be replaced by Ernest Edgar Pengilly on 1 January 1940. Due to the frustration that Graham Black had caused, he was not given a farewell ceremony by the Sultan as he usually did for other residents.

Ahmad Tajuddin and his family began to feel uneasy with the out distribution of Brunei's wealth from oil exports and for that reason, he encouraged the British government to ease financial regulations for the people of Brunei. In an attempt to suppress the Sultan, his living allowance was raised from $1,000 to $1,500 in 1934, and again was again given an increase of $500 a month in 1938. The Government of the United Kingdom gifted him a car in 1939.

The coronation of Ahmad Tajuddin as Sultan and Yang Di Pertuan Negara was held on 17 March 1940. Before that, he recited the Qur'an at the Istana Mahkota on 9 November 1939. In conjunction with his coronation ceremony, King George VI bestowed on him the Order of Saint Michael and Saint George (CMG). Since the 1940s, the Sultan has not attended the State Assembly as a sign of protest against the British resident. He urged the British to accept Bruneians into higher positions of the Brunei Administrative Service (BAS) in order to train and give experiences to local population. For the first time ever in 1941, 25 locals were appointed to serve in the government bureaucracy.

Second World War

With the likelihood of war with the Empire of Japan increasing, in 1941, the British began to encourage the establishment of local defence forces in Brunei, and neighbouring Sarawak and Borneo. Sultan Ahmad Tajuddin approved the establishment of the Brunei Volunteer Force and Special Police Force to assist the British in stopping the Japanese invasion of Brunei. An estimated 200 Bruneians initially volunteered, but by the time of the invasion few remained and no Allied troops were stationed in Brunei. The Sultan was appointed an Honorary Colonel of the force.

After the surrender to the Japanese in December 1941, Sultan Ahmad Tajuddin was forced to hand over his powers to the Imperial Japanese Army. The Japanese continued to recognise the Sultan as the head of the Islamic religion and the Royal Customs so long as he co-operated with them. He was advised by the Japanese to retire and offered a monthly pension together with medals of honour from the Emperor of Japan.

By mid-1945, the Japanese were facing defeat and their forces in Brunei were becoming more violent in their actions toward the populace. Locals were threatened by food shortage during the occupation. A plan was made to save the Sultan and the royal family from the increasing Japanese war crimes. Sultan Ahmad Tajuddin and the royal family, together with loyal palace officials, were hidden by Kasim bin Tamin, the village headman of Tantaya.

Istana Tantaya had been built in Kampong Tantaya and the Sultan lived there for about three months until Brunei was liberated by the Australian Army. After the Japanese surrender, the Sultan and the royal family returned to Brunei Town from Tantaya on Thursday at about 3:00 am. He was immediately taken to the British Army Headquarters at Bubungan Dua Belas. From here, he went to Istana Parit.

Later reign 
Due to the ever rising tension between the Sultan and the British resident, High Commissioner's Secretary Eric Ernest Falk Pretty was sent to defuse the situation. In August 1948, Mr Pretty was reappointed as a resident in an attempt to repair the relationship with the Malay states including Brunei. He recommended that the Sultan write a letter to the Secretary of State in hopes of the British government paying more attention to hardship and difficulties faced by Brunei. Mr Pretty also made an effort to build the Sultan a new palace after the previous was destroyed in the war. 

It was during the reign of Sultan Ahmad Tajuddin that saw Brunei Darussalam have its own national anthem "Allah Peliharakan Sultan", which is similar to "God Save the King" in England. In 1947, the national anthem was composed by Awang Haji Besar bin Sagap and lyrics written by Pengiran Setia Negara Pengiran Haji Mohammad Yusuf bin Pengiran Haji Abdul Rahim. That same year, he bestowed the title "Pengiran Bendahara Seri Maharaja Permaisuara" on his brother, Pengiran Muda Omar Ali Saifuddien.

Ahmad Tajuddin initially refused to celebrate his Silver Jubilee as a sign of protest against the residency after William John Peel refused to build a new palace. He was finally persuaded by Haji Mustafa and Malcolm MacDonald to return to Brunei and celebrate at Istana Kecil on 22 September 1949.

Illness and death
When Sultan Ahmad Tajuddin made a stopover in Singapore en route to the United Kingdom to revise the 1906 Agreement on raising oil royalties, he fell ill and was admitted to the Singapore General Hospital on 3 June 1950. He arrived at the hospital and later passed away from a haemorrhage.

When news of his death spread, the Crown Prince of Johore, Tengku Ismail went to Singapore General Hospital, to bring the body of the late sultan to Istana Besar, Johore Bahru. In Johore Bahru, his body was washed and covered with white cloth by Syed Salim bin Syed Hasan, the Chief Qadhi of Johore while the funeral prayer, led by the Mufti of Johore, Syed Alwi Al-Hadad. Upon completion of his funeral, his body was laid in state at the foyer of the Grand Palace of Johore Bahru, to provide opportunities for national dignitaries, senior government officials and local community leaders from different ethnic and religious, to pay their respects to the late monarch and send their condolences to his wife. Malcolm MacDonald brought a wreath and attended the funeral on 4 June 1950. 

On 5 June 1950, his coffin was taken to Kallang Airport to be flown to Labuan by the Royal Air Force (RAF) Douglas C-47 Dakota, accompanied by his wife and the royal family. Before the plane took off to Labuan, many national dignitaries and foreign ambassadors, present at the Airport, to pay their respects to the late king. Among them were;
 The Sultan of Selangor, his wife and the Crown Prince of Selangor.
 Mr. A.D. York (on behalf of Malcolm MacDonald).
 F.J. Mellersh, A.O.C. Malaya.
 Mr. R.J. Curtis, British advisor to Selangor.
 The Crown Prince of Johore and his wife.
 Mr. Bradley and Mr. G.T. MacBryan.
 Dato Wan Idris, Acting Chief Minister of Johore.

As soon as the plane that carried his coffin arrived at Labuan Airport, it was met with a parade of honour, composed of members of the Labuan Police Force to pay their respects to the late Sultan. His coffin was then taken to the Labuan Jetty to be brought to the Customs Wharf in Brunei by ship.

When the ship carrying his coffin arrived in Brunei Town, it was greeted by the Royal Family, State Dignitaries, VIPs, senior government officials, and the people in attendance. His coffin was then taken to the Istana Mahkota with special vehicles. His coffin was then laid in the General Office of the Government of Brunei.

Before the interment ceremony, on 6 June 1950, his brother, Pengiran Bendahara Seri Maharaja Permaisuara Pengiran Muda Omar Ali Saifuddien, was installed as the 28th Sultan of Brunei. The coffin was carried out of the Palace and headed to the Royal Mausoleum, accompanied by his younger brother, the new sultan, the royal family, dignitaries of the country, and the people, to be laid to rest at the Royal Mausoleum. His Highness was laid to rest beside his father, Sultan Muhammad Jamalul Alam II and his grandfather, Sultan Hashim Jalilul Alam Aqamaddin.

Mr. Malcolm MacDonald once spoke about His Highness Sultan Ahmad Tajuddin,

Personal life

Marriage 
Sultan Ahmad Tajuddin was married to Tengku Raihani, the eldest daughter of Sultan Alaeddin Sulaiman Shah of Selangor on 30 April 1934, when he was 20 years old. She would later be crowned on 15 October 1935.

Tengku Raihani was crowned as Tengku Ampuan of Brunei on 17 March 1940. In conjunction with his wedding ceremony, he has ordered a new palace to be built and named Istana Mahkota Khairani, where he and his wife lived. He also intended to change the name of Brunei Mosque to Ahmedia Mosque. However, upon completion of his wedding ceremony, a new palace was named Istana Mahkota and Brunei Mosque retained its name.

Family
His marriage to Tengku Ampuan Raihani, saw them welcome a daughter, named Pengiran Anak Puteri Noor Ehsani, born on 15 October 1935. Before he married Tengku Ampuan Raihani, he was already married with Kadayang Amas (Maskaton) binti Ampuan Salleh, who came from an ordinary family, from Kampong Sultan Lama. They had three daughters;
 Pengiran Anak Datin Seri Setia Siti Saerah (Balabab Besar), born in 1928, died on 4 November 2013.
 Pengiran Anak Datin Seri Setia Siti Zubaidah (Balabab Tengah)
 Pengiran Anak Datin Seri Setia Siti Halimah (Balabab Damit), born in 1935, died on 4 January 2009.

Legacy

Ahmad Tajuddin Primary School, a primary school in Kuala Belait was named after him.

Bibliography 
 (1939). Panduan Keselamatan (Safety Guides).
 Mohamed, Muhaimin (2011). Reign of Sultan Ahmad Tajuddin – Government, Community, and Change.

Honours
 King George V Silver Jubilee Medal - 1935
 King George VI Coronation Medal - 1937
 Companion of the Order of St. Michael and St. George (CMG) - 1940
 Knight Commander of the Order of the British Empire (KBE) - 1949

References

Tajuddin, Ahmad
Tajuddin, Ahmad
Tajuddin, Ahmad
Ahmad Tajuddin
Ahmad Tajuddin
Ahmad Tajuddin